Events in the year 2001 in Japan. It corresponds to the year Heisei 13 (平成１３年 or 平成十三年) in the Japanese calendar.

Incumbents
 Emperor: Akihito
 Prime Minister: Yoshiro Mori (L–Ishikawa) until April 26, Junichiro Koizumi (L–Kanagawa)
 Chief Cabinet Secretary: Yasuo Fukuda (L–Gunma)
 Chief Justice of the Supreme Court: Shigeru Yamaguchi
 Speaker of the House of Representatives: Tamisuke Watanuki (L–Toyama)
 President of the House of Councillors: Yutaka Inoue (L–Chiba), reelected August 7
 Diet sessions: 151st (regular, January 31 to June 29), 152nd (extraordinary, August 7 to August 10), 153rd (extraordinary, September 27 to December 7)

Governors
Aichi Prefecture: Masaaki Kanda 
Akita Prefecture: Sukeshiro Terata 
Aomori Prefecture: Morio Kimura 
Chiba Prefecture: Takeshi Numata (until 4 April); Akiko Dōmoto (starting 4 April)
Ehime Prefecture: Moriyuki Kato 
Fukui Prefecture: Yukio Kurita
Fukuoka Prefecture: Wataru Asō 
Fukushima Prefecture: Eisaku Satō
Gifu Prefecture: Taku Kajiwara 
Gunma Prefecture: Hiroyuki Kodera 
Hiroshima Prefecture: Yūzan Fujita 
Hokkaido: Tatsuya Hori
Hyogo Prefecture: Toshitami Kaihara (until 31 July); Toshizō Ido (starting 1 August)
Ibaraki Prefecture: Masaru Hashimoto 
Ishikawa Prefecture: Masanori Tanimoto
Iwate Prefecture: Hiroya Masuda 
Kagawa Prefecture: Takeki Manabe 
Kagoshima Prefecture: Tatsurō Suga 
Kanagawa Prefecture: Hiroshi Okazaki 
Kochi Prefecture: Daijiro Hashimoto 
Kumamoto Prefecture: Yoshiko Shiotani 
Kyoto Prefecture: Teiichi Aramaki 
Mie Prefecture: Masayasu Kitagawa 
Miyagi Prefecture: Shirō Asano 
Miyazaki Prefecture: Suketaka Matsukata 
Nagano Prefecture: Yasuo Tanaka
Nagasaki Prefecture: Genjirō Kaneko 
Nara Prefecture: Yoshiya Kakimoto
Niigata Prefecture: Ikuo Hirayama 
Oita Prefecture: Morihiko Hiramatsu 
Okayama Prefecture: Masahiro Ishii 
Okinawa Prefecture: Keiichi Inamine
Osaka Prefecture: Fusae Ōta 
Saga Prefecture: Isamu Imoto 
Saitama Prefecture: Yoshihiko Tsuchiya
Shiga Prefecture: Yoshitsugu Kunimatsu 
Shiname Prefecture: Nobuyoshi Sumita 
Shizuoka Prefecture: Yoshinobu Ishikawa 
Tochigi Prefecture: Akio Fukuda
Tokushima Prefecture: Toshio Endo 
Tokyo: Shintarō Ishihara 
Tottori Prefecture: Yoshihiro Katayama 
Toyama Prefecture: Yutaka Nakaoki
Wakayama Prefecture: Yoshiki Kimura 
Yamagata Prefecture: Kazuo Takahashi 
Yamaguchi Prefecture: Sekinari Nii 
Yamanashi Prefecture: Ken Amano

Events

January
January 6: Nurse Daisuke Mori arrested for an attempted murder of 11-year-old girl.
January 26: A JR yamanote line train coming into Shin-Ōkubo Station hits and kills a man who fell off the platform and two others who jumped onto the rails to rescue him.
January 31: 2001 Japan Airlines mid-air incident

February
February 9: The fishing boat Ehime Maru is struck by a U.S. submarine and sunk.

March
March 24: 2001 Geiyo earthquake, kill two people with injure 288 in Hiroshima and Ehime. 
March 27: Hikaru Saeki became the first female star officer (admiral and general) in the history of the Japan Self-Defense Forces (JSDF).
March 31: Universal Studios Japan opens in Osaka.

April
April 1: Sakura Bank and Sumitomo Bank merge to form Sumitomo Mitsui Banking Corporation.
April 6: Japanese government institutes new overtime regulations.
April 24: Junichiro Koizumi defeats Ryutaro Hashimoto in LDP polls to become prime minister.
April 26: Koizumi announces his first cabinet, with Makiko Tanaka as foreign minister and Heizo Takenaka as Minister of State for the Economy.

June
June 8: Osaka school massacre takes place.

July
July 13: Osaka is removed on the first ballot for the site of the 2008 Summer Olympics.
July 20: Hayao Miyazaki's Spirited Away premieres; it becomes the first anime film to win an Academy Award.
July 29: 2001 Japanese House of Councillors election.

August
August 13: Koizumi visits Yasukuni Shrine, angering China and South Korea.
August 16–26: The sixth World Games are held in Akita.
August 29: The first H-IIA rocket is launched from Tanegashima Space Center.

September
September 1: Myojo 56 building fire kills 44.
September 4: Tokyo DisneySea opens to the public as part of the Tokyo Disney Resort in Urayasu, Chiba, Japan.
September 11: The first case of Bovine spongiform encephalopathy (BSE) in Japan is discovered.
September 12: In the wake of the September 11, 2001 terrorist attacks in the United States, the Nikkei 225 index drops below 10,000 for the first time since 1984.

October
October 1: Ghibli Museum opens.
October 18: The East Japan Railway Company introduces the Suica smart card service to the Tokyo area.

December
December 1: Princess Aiko, potential heiress to the Imperial throne, is born.
December 9: Television performer Masashi Tashiro is arrested for peeping in a male bath-house.
December 21: TIME removes Masashi Tashiro from its "Person of the Year" poll after 2channel users vote the "bad boy" performer into first place.

The Nobel Prize
 Ryoji Noyori: 2001 Nobel Prize in Chemistry winner.

Births
January 2: Wakaba Higuchi, figure skater
 February 2: Maria Makino, pop singer
 February 4: Fūka Haruna, actress
 May 24: Noa Tsurushima, actress
 May 28: Rikako Sasaki, singer
 June 18: Nako Yabuki, singer
 June 19: Natsumi Sakai, swimmer
 June 25: Yurina Hirate, idol singer
 August 4: Seishiro Kato, actor
 August 31: Nana Mori, actress
 October 1: Pankun, chimpanzee
 October 6: Hitomi Honda, singer
 November 3: Rōki Sasaki, professional baseball pitcher (Chiba 
Marines)
 December 1: Princess Aiko, the daughter and only child of Crown Prince Naruhito, heir apparent to the Japanese throne, and Crown Princess Masako

Deaths
March 9: Mitsuo Kagawa, archaeologist (b. 1923)
April 7: Yasuhira Kiyohara, lieutenant of the Imperial army (b. 1914)
May 17: Hyōichi Kōno, adventurer (b. 1958)
July 24: Hiroshi Tsuburaya, actor (b. 1964)
July 28: Futaro Yamada, author (b. 1922)
August 25: Ginzō Matsuo, voice actor (b. 1951)
September 9: Shinji Sōmai, film director (b. 1948)
September 28: Isao Inokuma, judoka (b. 1938)
September 30: Takasi Tokioka, zoologist (b. 1913)
October 11: Fuku Akino, painter (b. 1908)
November 7: Sachiko Hidari, film actress (b. 1930)
November 15: Satoru Kobayashi, film director (b. 1930)
November 30: Kikutaro Baba, malacologist (b. 1905)
December 20: Kōji Nanbara, actor (b. 1927)
December 22: Shizue Kato, politician and activist (b. 1897)
December 29: Takashi Asahina, conductor (b. 1908)

See also
 2001 in Japanese television
 List of Japanese films of 2001

References

 
Years of the 21st century in Japan
Japan
Japan